Herminio Portell Vilá (1901-1992) was a Cuban writer and scholar.

Biography
Herminio Portell Vilá was born in Cárdenas, Cuba, in 1901 and died in Miami, Florida, in 1992. He earned a law degree at the University of Havana in 1927 and a degree in philosophy in 1934. He was a Guggenheim fellow from 1931–1933. He was professor of history and military history in Cuba, and during the 1930s he was a visiting professor at the University of California, Los Angeles; University of Florida; and at Black Mountain College. He also gave lectures at the University of Chicago, George Washington University, the National War College, the Inter-American Defense College, the U.S. Army War College, and the Foreign Service Institute in Washington D.C. Portell Vilá also served as the Latin American Radio Editor for the American Security Council (1967–1982) and writer/editor for The Voice of America and Radio Free Americas, which broadcasts information services to Latin America. As a writer, he wrote more than twenty books about Cuban history and published articles for several magazines such as Bohemia Libre. Even into his late eighties, Portell Vilá was participating in two daily radio programs on international affairs, publishing articles, and giving lectures around the country.

Works or publications

Notes and references

Further reading

External links
 The Herminio Portell Vilá papers are available at the Cuban Heritage Collection, University of Miami Libraries. The Herminio Portell Vilá papers include research writings, bibliographic notes, and clippings about events in Cuba and Latin America during his exile time in the United States (1960-1992).

1901 births
1992 deaths
Cuban emigrants to the United States
Cuban exiles
Cuban male writers